Bortom det blå is an album by Swedish singer Lisa Ekdahl. It is entirely in the Swedish language.

Track listing
Bortom det blå
Gå dit ifall du minns
Två lyckliga dårar
Jag behöver inget mer
Vi tillhör varann
Sakta sakta
Jag vill bara vara
Du var inte där för mig
Hyenorna skrattade gamarna
Genom dig ser jag ljuset
Cirklar
Vill ha dig kvar
Tänk inte mera
Natten skyddar de älskande

Charts

References

Lisa Ekdahl albums
Swedish-language albums
1997 albums